The following is a list of the best-selling Japanese manga series to date in terms of the number of collected tankōbon volumes sold. All series in this list have at least 20 million copies in circulation. This list is limited to Japanese manga and does not include manhwa, manhua or original English-language manga. The series are listed according to the highest circulation (copies in print) estimate of their collected tankōbon volumes as reported in reliable sources unless indicated otherwise. As for the series with the same total number of circulation or sales, they are arranged in alphabetical order.

Note that most manga series are first sold as part of manga magazines, where most manga series are first serialized, before being sold separately as individual collected tankōbon volumes. This list only includes the number of collected tankōbon volumes sold. For sales of manga magazines which includes these series, see List of Japanese manga magazines by circulation. The best-selling manga magazine (and best-selling comic magazine) is Weekly Shōnen Jump, with over 7.5billion copies sold. Estimated circulation figures for individual manga series published in manga magazines are given in footnotes.

Collected tankōbon volumes
Legend

At least 100 million copies and above

Between 50 million and 99 million copies

Between 30 million and 49 million copies

Between 20 million and 29 million copies

See also
List of best-selling comic series
List of best-selling visual novels
List of best-selling light novels
List of highest-grossing media franchises
List of Japanese manga magazines by circulation
List of The New York Times Manga Best Sellers
Weekly Shōnen Jump circulation figures

Explanatory notes

References

Manga
Best-selling
Literature records